Natalio Perinetti (28 December 1900 – 24 May 1985) was an Argentine footballer that spent most of his career in Racing Club, playing for 17 years and winning 12 titles with the club. A skilled  right winger, Perinetti is regarded as one of the greatest idols of the club, being a key player of the team that earned the nickname Academia in the 1910s.

Biography 
Perinetti started playing football matches with his friends in the district of Barracas, his birthplace. Due to his skills with the ball, he was encouraged to try registering with a club with the hope of developing a career in football.

His first club was Talleres (BA) where he played with the youth teams. At only 14 years old, Perinetti came to Racing in 1915, after being recommended by his older brother Juan. He started at the fourth division playing as right winger. It was during those years when he met Pedro Ochoa (other skilled player who would be later nicknamed the king of the dribbling), who became Perinetti's partner inside the field and best friend in life.

Perinetti debuted with the senior team two years later. He soon noted as a key player for Racing, being praised and recognised for his speed and control of the ball. He played 17 consecutive years in Racing, winning 12 titles with the club (10 domestic and 2 international). During his brilliant career in Racing, then president of Real Madrid, Santiago Bernabéu, tried to convince him to play for the club, but he refused the offer because of his love for Racing.

When Spanish club Real Madrid played v Racing during their tour on the Americas in 1927, Perinetti made a stunning performance which particularly impressed rival player Santiago Bernabéu, who wanted to hired Perinetti for his team, although he Argentine the offer.

Perinetti was part of the Argentina national football team where he played 7 games between 1923 and 1930, including the first FIFA World Cup held in Uruguay in 1930. He also played the 1929 South American Championship (current Copa América) with the national squad. He was part of Argentina's squad for the 1928 Summer Olympics, but he did not play in any matches.

In 1934 Perinetti was traded to River Plate but he only played a bunch of games there, retiring from football soon after. Then he was a sports commentator on television in the 60s.

Honours
All of them won with Racing Club:

National
 Primera División (5): 1917, 1918, 1919, 1921, 1925
 Copa de Honor Municipalidad de Buenos Aires (1): 1917
 Copa Ibarguren (2): 1916, 1917
 Copa Beccar Varela (1): 1932
 Copa de Competencia (LAF) (1): 1933

International
 Copa Aldao (2): 1917, 1918

References

External links

1900 births
1985 deaths
Argentine footballers
Argentine people of Italian descent
Argentina international footballers
Argentine Primera División players
Talleres de Remedios de Escalada footballers
Racing Club de Avellaneda footballers
Club Atlético River Plate footballers
1930 FIFA World Cup players
Olympic medalists in football
Association football midfielders
Olympic silver medalists for Argentina
Medalists at the 1928 Summer Olympics
Footballers from Buenos Aires